The Martin Zapata High School is one of the four high schools depending on the National University of Cuyo. It is located in Mendoza, Argentina. It was named after the delegate in the 1853 Argentine constitutional convention Martin Zapata.

Secondary schools in Argentina
Educational institutions established in 1912
1912 establishments in Argentina